Whitby Park is the main urban park in Ellesmere Port, Cheshire, England. It is managed by Cheshire West and Chester Council.

History

The park was formerly the grounds of Whitby Hall, a Victorian house built in the 1860s by the Grace family, until being bought by the district council in 1931 and turned into a park. Whitby Hall is the home to Action Transport Theatre, Whitby Lodge by a public private company Edsential and the Hall garden by Whitby Park Community Garden.

Facilities
The park has formal gardens, football pitches, a climbing area, a basketball court, tennis courts, crown green bowling, dog walking, skatepark, a wooded copse, fish pond and two children's play areas.  A short (0.4 mile) sculpture trail featuring work by artist Steve des Landes on the theme of Air Quality loops around Whitby Hall.

See also

List of parks and open spaces in Cheshire

References

Parks and open spaces in Cheshire
Ellesmere Port